Nacoleia perstygialis is a moth in the family Crambidae. It was described by George Hampson in 1912. It is found in Hubei, China, but has also been recorded from Costa Rica.

References

Moths described in 1912
Taxa named by George Hampson
Nacoleia
Moths of Asia
Moths of Central America